Mijiic is a small language family of Arunachal Pradesh in northeastern India, consisting of the erstwhile possible language isolate (dialect cluster) Miji and the recently discovered Bangru language. The two languages are clearly related, though "the very different consonant inventories makes seeking regular correspondences difficult." The Bangru and Miji are geographically separated and are not clearly aware of their linguistic relationship, though there is some evidence for contact between East Miji and Bangru in the past. They are commonly included in the Sino-Tibetan language family, but the evidence is weak.

Numerals
The basic numerals correspond.

References

Further reading
Blench, Roger. 2015. The Mijiic languages: distribution, dialects, wordlist and classification. m.s.

Hrusish languages